The 2013–14 Charlotte Bobcats season was the 24th season of the franchise in the National Basketball Association (NBA). It was also the 10th and final season under the Bobcats name. The Bobcats reached the playoffs for the first time since 2010 and were swept by the two-time defending champion and eventual Eastern Conference champion Miami Heat in the first round. Like in 2010, the Bobcats were swept in the first round. Starting with the 2014–15 NBA season, the franchise reclaimed the name and history of the city's original NBA franchise, the Hornets.

Key dates
 June 27: The 2013 NBA draft took place at the Barclays Center in Brooklyn, New York.
 July 1: 2013 NBA Free Agency begins.

Draft picks

Future draft picks

Credits

2014 first round draft pick from Portland

Portland's 1st round pick to Charlotte (top-12 protected in 2014 and 2015, and unprotected in 2016). [Charlotte-Portland, 2/24/2011]

2014 first round draft pick from Detroit

Detroit's 1st round pick to Charlotte (top-8 protected in 2014, top-1 protected in 2015, and unprotected in 2016). [Charlotte-Detroit, 6/26/2012]

Debits

2014 first round draft pick to Chicago

Charlotte's 1st round pick to Chicago (top-10 protected in 2014, top-8 in 2015, and unprotected in 2016). [Charlotte-Chicago, 2/18/2010]

2016 second round draft pick to San Antonio

Charlotte's 2016 2nd round pick to San Antonio protected for selections 31-55 (if this pick falls within its protected range and is therefore not conveyed, then Charlotte's obligation to San Antonio will be extinguished) [Charlotte-San Antonio, 2/18/2010]

Roster

Preseason

|- style="background:#fcc;"
| 1
| October 8
| Atlanta
| 
| Ramon Sessions (17)
| Al Jefferson (9)
| Ramon Sessions (6)
| U.S. Cellular Center4,457
| 0–1
|- style="background:#fcc;"
| 2
| October 11
| @ Miami
| 
| Al Jefferson (11)
| Al Jefferson (7)
| Ramon Sessions (6)
| Sprint Center18,770
| 0–2
|- style="background:#cfc;"
| 3
| October 12
| @ Milwaukee
| 
| Jannero Pargo (24)
| Bismack Biyombo (21)
| Ramon Sessions (4)
| BMO Harris Bradley Center7,839
| 1–2
|- style="background:#cfc;"
| 4
| October 15
| @ Cleveland
| 
| Kemba Walker (14)
| Bismack Biyombo (11)
| Kemba Walker (5)
| Canton Memorial Civic Center4,047
| 2–2
|- style="background:#cfc;"
| 5
| October 17
| Philadelphia
| 
| Ben Gordon (22)
| Bismack Biyombo (7)
| Ramon Sessions (6)
| Time Warner Cable Arena16,283
| 3–2
|- style="background:#fcc;"
| 6
| October 19
| Dallas
| 
| Cody Zeller (14)
| Bismack Biyombo (13)
| Ramon Sessions (6)
| Greensboro Coliseum7,678
| 3–3
|- style="background:#cfc;"
| 7
| October 24
| Cleveland
| 
| Jeffery Taylor (20)
| Cody Zeller (8)
| McRoberts, Henderson, Walker (5)
| Time Warner Cable Arena5,936
| 4–3
|- style="background:#cfc;"
| 8
| October 25
| @ New York
| 
| Josh McRoberts (19)
| Bismack Biyombo (20)
| Kemba Walker (6)
| Madison Square Garden19,812
| 5–3

Regular season

Season standings

Game log

|- style="background:#fcc;"
| 1
| October 30
| @ Houston
| 
| Josh McRoberts (15)
| Kidd-Gilchrist & Jefferson (8)
| Kemba Walker (5)
| Toyota Center18,083
| 0–1

|- style="background:#cfc;"
| 2
| November 1
| Cleveland
| 
| Kemba Walker (23)
| Bismack Biyombo (10)
| Josh McRoberts (8)
| Time Warner Cable Arena18,017
| 1–1
|- style="background:#fcc;"
| 3
| November 2
| @ New Orleans
| 
| Ramon Sessions (22)
| Jeff Adrien (13)
| Ramon Sessions (6)
| New Orleans Arena15,232
| 1–2
|- style="background:#cfc;"
| 4
| November 5
| @ New York
| 
| Kemba Walker (25)
| Kidd-Gilchrist, Henderson, Adrien (8)
| Kemba Walker (6)
| Madison Square Garden19,812
| 2–2
|- style="background:#cfc;"
| 5
| November 6
| Toronto
| 
| Gerald Henderson (23)
| Bismack Biyombo (11)
| Kemba Walker (7)
| Time Warner Cable Arena11,118
| 3–2
|- style="background:#fcc;"
| 6
| November 8
| New York
| 
| Kemba Walker (25)
| Bismack Biyombo (11)
| Kemba Walker (5)
| Time Warner Cable Arena16,465
| 3–3
|- style="background:#fcc;"
| 7
| November 11
| Atlanta
| 
| Josh McRoberts (19)
| Al Jefferson (7)
| Josh McRoberts (7)
| Time Warner Cable Arena13,996
| 3–4
|- style="background:#cfc;"
| 8
| November 13
| @ Boston
| 
| Al Jefferson (22)
| Al Jefferson (11)
| Gerald Henderson (5)
| TD Garden17,032
| 4–4
|- style="background:#cfc;"
| 9
| November 15
| @ Cleveland
| 
| Michael Kidd-Gilchrist (16)
| Bismack Biyombo (12)
| Walker & Sessions (7)
| Quicken Loans Arena18,679
| 5–4
|- style="background:#fcc;"
| 10
| November 16
| Miami
| 
| Kemba Walker (22)
| Bismack Biyombo (8)
| Josh McRoberts (9)
| Time Warner Cable Arena19,084
| 5–5
|- style="background:#fcc;"
| 11
| November 18
| @ Chicago
| 
| Jeffery Taylor (20)
| Gerald Henderson (8)
| Gerald Henderson (6)
| United Center21,628
| 5–6
|- style="background:#cfc;"
| 12
| November 20
| Brooklyn
| 
| Kemba Walker (31)
| Jeff Adrien (10)
| Henderson, McRoberts (5)
| Time Warner Cable Arena13,843
| 6–6
|- style="background:#fcc;"
| 13
| November 22
| Phoenix
| 
| Gerald Henderson (17)
| Cody Zeller (9)
| Kemba Walker (6)
| Time Warner Cable Arena14,916
| 6–7
|- style="background:#cfc;"
| 14
| November 23
| @ Milwaukee
| 
| Al Jefferson (19)
| Jeff Adrien (10)
| Ramon Sessions (6)
| BMO Harris Bradley Center14,871
| 7–7
|- style="background:#fcc;"
| 15
| November 25
| Boston
| 
| Kemba Walker (28)
| Josh McRoberts (7)
| Josh McRoberts (5)
| Time Warner Cable Arena13,558
| 7–8
|- style="background:#fcc;"
| 16
| November 27
| Indiana
| 
| Al Jefferson (16)
| Al Jefferson (9)
| Kemba Walker (3)
| Time Warner Cable Arena15,170
| 7–9
|- style="background:#cfc;"
| 17
| November 29
| Milwaukee
| 
| Al Jefferson (23)
| Bismack Biyombo (14)
| Josh McRoberts (4)
| Time Warner Cable Arena15,081
| 8–9

|- style="background:#fcc;"
| 18
| December 1
| @ Miami
| 
| Kemba Walker (27)
| Al Jefferson (13)
| Kemba Walker (6)
| American Airlines Arena19,617
| 8–10
|- style="background:#fcc;"
| 19
| December 3
| @ Dallas
| 
| Al Jefferson (19)
| Al Jefferson (12)
| Kemba Walker (5)
| American Airlines Center19,612
| 8–11
|- style="background:#cfc;"
| 20
| December 6
| Philadelphia
| 
| Jeff Taylor (21)
| Al Jefferson (12)
| Kemba Walker (10)
| Time Warner Cable Arena14,088
| 9–11
|- style="background:#cfc;"
| 21
| December 9
| Golden State
| 
| Kemba Walker (31)
| Josh McRoberts (10)
| Josh McRoberts (6)
| Time Warner Cable Arena13,129
| 10–11
|- style="background:#fcc;"
| 22
| December 11
| Orlando
| 
| Gerald Henderson (12)
| Al Jefferson (11)
| Ben Gordon (5)
| Time Warner Cable Arena11,377
| 10–12
|- style="background:#fcc;"
| 23
| December 13
| @ Indiana
| 
| Al Jefferson (21)
| Al Jefferson (9)
| Gerald Henderson (4)
| Bankers Life Fieldhouse18,165
| 10–13
|- style="background:#fcc;"
| 24
| December 14
| L.A. Lakers
| 
| Kemba Walker (24)
| Al Jefferson (9)
| Kemba Walker (8)
| Time Warner Cable Arena17,101
| 10–14
|- style="background:#cfc;"
| 25
| December 17
| Sacramento
| 
| Kemba Walker (24)
| Jefferson & Biyombo (9)
| Ramon Sessions (6)
| Time Warner Cable Arena11,339
| 11–14
|- style="background:#cfc;"
| 26
| December 18
| @ Toronto
| 
| Kemba Walker (29)
| Al Jefferson (11)
| Josh McRoberts (7)
| Air Canada Centre15,201
| 12–14
|- style="background:#cfc;"
| 27
| December 20
| @ Detroit
| 
| Kemba Walker (34)
| Al Jefferson (14)
| Josh McRoberts (7)
| Palace of Auburn Hills12,453
| 13–14
|- style="background:#fcc;"
| 28
| December 21
| Utah
| 
| Kemba Walker (20)
| Al Jefferson (11)
| Kemba Walker (4)
| Time Warner Cable Arena18,078
| 13–15
|- style="background:#cfc;"
| 29
| December 23
| Milwaukee
| 
| Al Jefferson (26)
| Jefferson & Walker (9)
| Kemba Walker (10)
| Time Warner Cable Arena13,534
| 14–15
|- style="background:#fcc;"
| 30
| December 27
| Oklahoma City
| 
| Kemba Walker (18)
| Al Jefferson (11)
| McRoberts & Walker (7)
| Time Warner Cable Arena18,129
| 14–16
|- style="background:#fcc;"
| 31
| December 28
| @ Atlanta
| 
| Al Jefferson (24)
| Al Jefferson (23)
| Josh McRoberts (9)
| Philips Arena15,180
| 14–17
|- style="background:#fcc;"
| 32
| December 30
| @ Utah
| 
| Gerald Henderson (19)
| Al Jefferson (10)
| Kemba Walker (4)
| EnergySolutions Arena19,125
| 14–18

|- style="background:#fcc;"
| 33
| January 1
| @ L.A. Clippers
| 
| Jefferson & Walker (14)
| Al Jefferson (12)
| McRoberts, Jefferson & Sessions (4)
| Staples Center19,160
| 14–19
|- style="background:#fcc;"
| 34
| January 2
| @ Portland
| 
| Chris Douglas-Roberts (20)
| Jefferson & Zeller (5)
| Walker & Sessions (3)
| Moda Center20,014
| 14–20
|- style="background:#cfc;"
| 35
| January 4
| @ Sacramento
| 
| Kemba Walker (30)
| Josh McRoberts (11)
| Kemba Walker (6)
| Sleep Train Arena16,410
| 15–20
|- style="background:#fcc;"
| 36
| January 7
| Washington
| 
| Gerald Henderson (27)
| Al Jefferson (10)
| Kemba Walker (8)
| Time Warner Cable Arena12,079
| 15–21
|- style="background:#fcc;"
| 37
| January 10
| @ Minnesota
| 
| Anthony Tolliver (21)
| Jefferson & Biyombo (7)
| Kemba Walker (7)
| Target Center13,767
| 15–22
|- style="background:#fcc;"
| 38
| January 11
| @ Chicago
| 
| Gerald Henderson Jr. (30)
| Al Jefferson (11)
| Kemba Walker (5)
| United Center21,413
| 15–23
|- style="background:#cfc;"
| 39
| January 14
| New York
| 
| Al Jefferson (35)
| Al Jefferson (8)
| Kemba Walker & Ramon Sessions (5)
| Time Warner Cable Arena15,156
| 16–23
|- style="background:#fcc;"
| 40
| January 15
| @ Philadelphia
| 
| Kemba Walker (26)
| Al Jefferson (8)
| Kemba Walker (8)
| Wells Fargo Center10,106
| 16–24
|- style="background:#cfc;"
| 41
| January 17
| @ Orlando
| 
| Al Jefferson (30)
| Al Jefferson (16)
| Kemba Walker (10)
| Amway Center16,164
| 17–24
|- style="background:#fcc;"
| 42
| January 18
| Miami
| 
| Al Jefferson (22)
| Al Jefferson (14)
| Kemba Walker (8)
| Time Warner Cable Arena19,631
| 17–25
|- style="background:#cfc;"
| 43
| January 20
| Toronto
| 
| Ramon Sessions (23)
| Al Jefferson (19)
| Al Jefferson (7)
| Time Warner Cable Arena14,929
| 18–25
|- style="background:#cfc;"
| 44
| January 22
| L.A. Clippers
| 
| Al Jefferson (24)
| Al Jefferson (10)
| Ramon Sessions (8)
| Time Warner Cable Arena14,760
| 19–25
|- style="background:#fcc;"
| 45
| January 24
| @ New York
| 
| Al Jefferson (25)
| Al Jefferson (9)
| Jannero Pargo (8)
| Madison Square Garden19,812
| 19–26
|- style="background:#fcc;"
| 46
| January 25
| Chicago
| 
| Al Jefferson (32)
| Al Jefferson (13)
| Ramon Sessions (11)
| Time Warner Cable Arena18,252
| 19–27
|- style="background:#cfc;"
| 47
| January 29
| @ Denver
| 
| Al Jefferson (35)
| Al Jefferson (11)
| Ramon Sessions (7)
| Pepsi Center16,151
| 20–27
|- style="background:#cfc;"
| 48
| January 31
| @ L.A. Lakers
| 
| Al Jefferson (40)
| Al Jefferson (18)
| Ramon Sessions (13)
| Staples Center18,997
| 21–27

|- style="background:#fcc;"
| 49
| February 1
| @ Phoenix
| 
| Anthony Tolliver (14)
| Al Jefferson (6)
| Jannero Pargo (6)
| US Airways Center16,248
| 21–28
|- style="background:#cfc;"
| 50
| February 4
| @ Golden State
| 
| Al Jefferson (30)
| Al Jefferson (13)
| Kemba Walker (7)
| Oracle Arena19,596
| 22–28
|- style="background:#fcc;"
| 51
| February 8
| San Antonio
| 
| Al Jefferson (26)
| Michael Kidd-Gilchrist (12)
| Kemba Walker (8)
| Time Warner Cable Arena19,084
| 22–29
|- style="background:#cfc;"
| 52
| February 11
| Dallas
| 
| Al Jefferson (30)
| Kemba Walker (9)
| Josh McRoberts (13)
| Time Warner Cable Arena11,467
| 23–29
|- style="background:#fcc;"
| 53
| February 12
| @ Brooklyn
| 
| Kemba Walker (16)
| Al Jefferson (10)
| Josh McRoberts (3)
| Barclays Center16,862
| 23–30
|- align="center"
|colspan="9" bgcolor="#bbcaff"|All-Star Break
|- style="background:#cfc;"
| 54
| February 18
| @ Detroit
| 
| Al Jefferson (32)
| Al Jefferson (12)
| Jefferson & Henderson (7)
| Palace of Auburn Hills11,285
| 24–30
|- style="background:#cfc;"
| 55
| February 19
| Detroit
| 
| Al Jefferson (29)
| Jefferson, Henderson & Biyombo (8)
| Kemba Walker (16)
| Time Warner Cable Arena14,400
| 25–30
|- style="background:#cfc;"
| 56
| February 21
| New Orleans
| 
| Al Jefferson (33)
| Al Jefferson (10)
| Kemba Walker (8)
| Time Warner Cable Arena15,867
| 26–30
|- style="background:#cfc;"
| 57
| February 22
| Memphis
| 
| Kemba Walker (31)
| Al Jefferson (9)
| Kemba Walker (5)
| Time Warner Cable Arena18,317
| 27–30
|- style="background:#fcc;"
| 58
| February 28
| @ San Antonio
| 
| Al Jefferson (20)
| Kidd-Gilchrist & Zeller(8)
| Josh McRoberts (10)
| AT&T Center18,581
| 27–31

|- style="background:#fcc;"
| 59
| March 2
| @ Oklahoma City
| 
| Al Jefferson (25)
| Al Jefferson (7)
| Josh McRoberts (6)
| Chesapeake Energy Arena18,203
| 27–32
|- style="background:#fcc;"
| 60
| March 3
| @ Miami
| 
| Al Jefferson (38)
| Al Jefferson (19)
| Kemba Walker (8)
| American Airlines Arena19,727
| 27–33
|- style="background:#cfc;"
| 61
| March 5
| Indiana
| 
| Al Jefferson (34)
| Al Jefferson (8)
| Kemba Walker (9)
| Time Warner Cable Arena15,372
| 28–33
|- style="background:#cfc;"
| 62
| March 7
| Cleveland
| 
| Al Jefferson (28)
| Chris Douglas-Roberts (9)
| Kemba Walker (14)
| Time Warner Cable Arena15,688
| 29–33
|- style="background:#fcc;"
| 63
| March 8
| @ Memphis
| 
| Al Jefferson (17)
| Cody Zeller (9)
| Kemba Walker (5)
| FedExForum17,298
| 29–34
|- style="background:#cfc;"
| 64
| March 10
| Denver
| 
| Al Jefferson (26)
| Al Jefferson (13)
| Kemba Walker (7)
| Time Warner Cable Arena14,312
| 30–34
|- style="background:#cfc;"
| 65
| March 12
| @ Washington
| 
| Al Jefferson (26)
| Michael Kidd-Gilchrist (12)
| Kemba Walker (5)
| Verizon Center17,220
| 31–34
|- style="background:#cfc;"
| 66
| March 14
| Minnesota
| 
| Al Jefferson (25)
| Al Jefferson (16)
| Kemba Walker (7)
| Time Warner Cable Arena16,983
| 32–34
|- style="background:#cfc;"
| 67
| March 16
| @ Milwaukee
| 
| Kemba Walker (21)
| Al Jefferson (7)
| Kemba Walker (8)
| BMO Harris Bradley Center14,536
| 33–34
|- style="background:#fcc;"
| 68
| March 17
| Atlanta
| 
| Kemba Walker (20)
| Al Jefferson (12)
| Kemba Walker (7)
| Time Warner Cable Arena14,419
| 33–35
|- style="background:#fcc;"
| 69
| March 19
| @ Brooklyn
| 
| Al Jefferson (18)
| Al Jefferson (12)
| Kemba Walker (7)
| Barclays Center17,222
| 33–36
|- style="background:#cfc;"
| 70
| March 22
| Portland
| 
| Al Jefferson (28)
| Gerald Henderson (8)
| Jefferson & Walker (6)
| Time Warner Cable Arena18,706
| 34–36
|- style="background:#fcc;"
| 71
| March 24
| Houston
| 
| Kemba Walker (22)
| Al Jefferson (11)
| Josh McRoberts (4)
| Time Warner Cable Arena15,511
| 34–37
|- style="background:#cfc;"
| 72
| March 26
| Brooklyn
| 
| Al Jefferson (35)
| Al Jefferson (15)
| Kemba Walker (12)
| Time Warner Cable Arena15,943
| 35–37
|- style="background:#fcc;"
| 73
| March 28
| @ Orlando
| 
| McRoberts & Walker (24)
| Al Jefferson (8)
| Kemba Walker (8)
| Amway Center16,003
| 35–38
|- style="background:#cfc;"
| 74
| March 31
| Washington
| 
| Kemba Walker (21)
| Al Jefferson (11)
| Kemba Walker (10)
| Time Warner Cable Arena14,894
| 36–38

|- style="background:#cfc;"
| 75
| April 2
| @ Philadelphia
| 
| Al Jefferson (25)
| Al Jefferson (10)
| Walker, Tolliver & Pargo (5)
| Wells Fargo Center12,136
| 37–38
|- style="background:#cfc;"
| 76
| April 4
| Orlando
| 
| Al Jefferson (29)
| Al Jefferson (16)
| Kemba Walker (10)
| Time Warner Cable Arena17,708
| 38–38
|- style="background:#cfc;"
| 77
| April 5
| @ Cleveland
| 
| Al Jefferson (24)
| Al Jefferson (15)
| Kemba Walker (7)
| Quicken Loans Arena18,179
| 39–38
|- style="background:#cfc;"
| 78
| April 9
| @ Washington
| 
| Al Jefferson (20)
| Al Jefferson (18)
| Kemba Walker (12)
| Verizon Center17,784
| 40-38
|- style="background:#fcc;"
| 79
| April 11
| @ Boston
| 
| Al Jefferson (32)
| Al Jefferson (10)
| Josh McRoberts (10)
| TD Garden18,624
| 40-39
|- style="background:#cfc;"
| 80
| April 12
| Philadelphia
| 
| Al Jefferson (29)
| Al Jefferson (12)
| Luke Ridnour (8)
| Time Warner Cable Arena17,140
| 41–39
|- style="background:#cfc;"
| 81
| April 14
| @ Atlanta
| 
| Al Jefferson (27)
| Al Jefferson (15)
| Kemba Walker (7)
| Philips Arena11,918
| 42–39
|- style="background:#cfc;"
| 82
| April 16
| Chicago
| 
| Kemba Walker (22)
| Al Jefferson (18)
| Kemba Walker (8)
| Time Warner Cable Arena17,627
| 43–39

Playoffs

Game log

|- style="background:#fcc;"
| 1
| April 20
| @ Miami
| 
| Kemba Walker (20)
| Al Jefferson (10)
| Kemba Walker (6)
| American Airlines Arena19,640
| 0–1
|- style="background:#fcc;"
| 2
| April 23
| @ Miami
| 
| Michael Kidd-Gilchrist (22)
| Al Jefferson (13)
| Kemba Walker (8)
| American Airlines Arena19,603
| 0–2
|- style="background:#fcc;"
| 3
| April 26
| Miami
| 
| Al Jefferson (20)
| Josh McRoberts (9)
| Luke Ridnour (6)
| Time Warner Cable Arena20,367
| 0–3
|- style="background:#fcc;"
| 4
| April 28
| Miami
| 
| Kemba Walker (29)
| Josh McRoberts (10)
| Walker & McRoberts (5)
| Time Warner Cable Arena20,292
| 0–4

Player statistics

Regular season

|- align="center" bgcolor="#f0f0f0"
|  || 25 || 0 || 10.2 || .550 || .000 || .520 || 3.5 || 0.3 || 0.3 || 0.6 || 2.3
|- align="center" bgcolor=""
|  || 77 || 9 || 13.9 || style="background:black;color:white;" | .611 || .000 || .517 || 4.8 || 0.1 || 0.1 || style="background:black;color:white;" | 1.1 || 2.9
|- align="center" bgcolor="#f0f0f0"
|  || 49 || 8 || 20.7 || .440 || .386 || .805 || 2.4 || 1.0 || 0.6 || 0.3 || 6.9
|- align="center" bgcolor=""
|  || 19 || 0 || 14.7 || .343 || .276 || .810 || 1.4 || 1.1 || 0.5 || 0.1 || 5.2
|- align="center" bgcolor="#f0f0f0"
|  || 1 || 0 || 4.0 || .000 || .000 || .000 || 0.0 || 0.0 || 1.0 || 0.0 || 0.0
|- align="center" bgcolor=""
|  || 77 || 77 || 31.9 || .433 || .348 || .761 || 4.0 || 2.6 || 0.7 || 0.4 || 14.0
|- align="center" bgcolor="#f0f0f0"
|  || 73 || 73 || 35.0 || .509 || .200 || .690 || style="background:black;color:white;" | 10.8 || 2.1 || 0.9 || style="background:black;color:white;" | 1.1 || style="background:black;color:white;" | 21.8
|- align="center" bgcolor=""
|  || 62 || 62 || 24.2 || .473 || .111 || .614 || 5.2 || 0.8 || 0.7 || 0.6 || 7.2
|- align="center" bgcolor="#f0f0f0"
|  || 78 || style="background:black;color:white;" | 78 || 30.3 || .436 || .361 || .729 || 4.8 || 4.3 || 0.7 || 0.6 || 8.5
|- align="center" bgcolor=""
|  || 22 || 1 || 23.0 || .438 || .406 || style="background:black;color:white;" | .961 || 1.8 || 1.7 || 0.5 || 0.0 || 11.2
|- align="center" bgcolor="#f0f0f0"
|  || 29 || 0 || 8.3 || .441 || .400 || .727 || 0.7 || 1.8 || 0.5 || 0.0 || 4.7
|- align="center" bgcolor=""
|  || 25 || 2 || 15.1 || .389 || .300 || .571 || 1.4 || 2.2 || 0.4 || 0.2 || 4.0
|- align="center" bgcolor="#f0f0f0"
|  || 55 || 7 || 23.7 || .409 || .221 || .782 || 2.1 || 3.7 || 0.6 || 0.1 || 10.5
|- align="center" bgcolor=""
|  || 1 || 0 || 3.0 || .000 || .000 || .000 || 0.0 || 0.0 || 0.0 || 0.0 || 0.0
|- align="center" bgcolor="#f0f0f0"
|  || 64 || 9 || 20.3 || .420 || style="background:black;color:white;" | .413 || .805 || 2.6 || 0.7 || 0.3 || 0.2 || 6.1
|- align="center" bgcolor=""
|  || 73 || 73 || style="background:black;color:white;" | 35.8 || .393 || .333 || .837 || 4.2 || style="background:black;color:white;" | 6.1 || style="background:black;color:white;" | 1.2 || 0.4 || 17.7
|- align="center" bgcolor="#f0f0f0"
|  || 2 || 0 || 5.0 || .000 || .000 || .000 || 1.0 || 0.0 || 0.5 || 0.0 || 0.0
|- align="center" bgcolor=""
|  || style="background:black;color:white;" | 82 || 3 || 17.3 || .426 || .000 || .730 || 4.3 || 1.1 || 0.5 || 0.5 || 6.0
|}

Transactions

Overview

Free agents

External links

Charlotte
Charlotte Bobcats seasons
Bob
Bob